United Nations Security Council resolution 616, adopted unanimously on 20 July 1988, after hearing representations from the Islamic Republic of Iran, the Council expressed its distress at the downing of Iran Air Flight 655 over the Strait of Hormuz by a missile from the United States Navy cruiser  during the conflict between Iran and Iraq.

The Council went on to express its condolences to the victims of the incident and welcomed a decision by the International Civil Aviation Organization, at the request of Iran, to begin an immediate investigation into the incident. It also welcomed announcements by both Iran and the United States of their cooperation with the investigation.

Resolution 616 urged all parties to the Convention on International Civil Aviation in 1944 to fully observe the rules and practices concerning the safety of civil aviation. It also reminded Iran and Iraq to fully implement Resolution 598 as the only just and durable basis for a settlement of the Iran–Iraq War.

See also
 Iran–Iraq relations
 Iran–Iraq War
 Iran – United States relations
 List of United Nations Security Council Resolutions 601 to 700 (1987–1991)
 Resolutions 479, 514, 522, 540, 552, 582, 598, 612, 619 and 620

References
Text of the Resolution at undocs.org

External links
 

 0616
 0616
1988 in Iran
1988 in Iraq
Iran–United States relations
July 1988 events